Western Cove is located on Bar Haven Island in Placentia Bay. It is formed between Newfoundland, Labrador, and Bar Haven.

See also
List of communities in Newfoundland and Labrador
List of ghost towns in Newfoundland and Labrador

References 

Ghost towns in Newfoundland and Labrador